The President's Cancer Panel is a three-person panel that reports to the President of the United States on the development and execution of the National Cancer Program.  Members serve 3-year terms, and at least two of the three panel members must be distinguished scientists or physicians. The President appoints one of the members to a one-year Chair position. The Panel meets at least four times each year, and these meetings are open to the public. 
The Panel was established in 1971 by the National Cancer Act.

, the Panel consists of John P. Williams, M.D., F.A.C.S. (Chair), Edith Peterson Mitchell, MD, MACP, FCPP, FRCP (London), and Robert A. Ingram, M.D.

References

Cancer organizations based in the United States